The 2007 Atlantic Coast Conference men's basketball tournament took place from March 8–11 in Tampa, Florida, at the St. Pete Times Forum, the first time the tournament was held in Florida. The quarterfinal games were televised nationwide on ESPN2. Semifinals and the championship game were televised on ESPN. The tournament was also televised by Raycom Sports in ACC markets. For the first time ever, Raycom broadcast the tournament in high definition.

The top four regular season teams (North Carolina, Virginia, Virginia Tech, and Boston College) received first-round byes and played their first games in the quarterfinals. Both North Carolina and Virginia finished the regular season tied for first place with an 11–5 record, but North Carolina received the #1 seed by virtue of the head-to-head tiebreaker.

All four opening-round games were won by the lower seeds. This tournament was the lowest Duke had been seeded (seventh) in the ACC Tournament since 1995, when they were the ninth seed.  Their on-court struggles were compounded by the suspension of freshman Gerald Henderson.  By defeating Duke, NC State ended Duke's 8-year domination of the ACC Tournament.  Prior to this loss, Duke was 23–1 in ACC Tournament play over the previous 8 years, losing only the 2004 finals to Maryland. The 2007 final round was identical to the final round of the Women's ACC Tournament, with North Carolina beating NC State for the title.

The 2007 tournament marked the first time a 10th seed won a game in an ACC tournament, much less three in a row (although 12th seed Wake Forest won two games in the 2006 Tournament). It was the second time a team has played 4 games (NC State in 1997), and the first time a team seeded as low as 10 reached the championship game. Previously the lowest seed to reach the title game was #8 seed NC State in 1997, when the conference had nine members.

By winning the ACC championship, North Carolina received an automatic bid to the NCAA tournament. North Carolina's Brandan Wright won the tournament's Most Valuable Player award.

Bracket

* Denotes Overtime Game

** Denotes Double Overtime Game

AP Rankings at time of tournament

References

Tournament
ACC men's basketball tournament
Basketball competitions in Florida
College sports in Florida
Sports competitions in Tampa, Florida
2007 in sports in Florida
21st century in Tampa, Florida
ACC men's basketball tournament